Tate Modern is an art gallery located in London. It houses the United Kingdom's national collection of international modern and contemporary art, and forms part of the Tate group together with Tate Britain, Tate Liverpool and Tate St Ives. It is located in the former Bankside Power Station, in the Bankside area of the London Borough of Southwark.

Tate Modern is one of the largest museums of modern and contemporary art in the world. As with the UK's other national galleries and museums, there is no admission charge for access to the collection displays, which take up the majority of the gallery space, whereas tickets must be purchased for the major temporary exhibitions. Due to the COVID-19 pandemic the museum was closed for 173 days in 2020, and attendance plunged by 77 per cent to 1,432,991 in 2020.  Nonetheless, the Tate was third in the list of most-visited art museums in the world in 2020, and the most visited in Britain. The nearest railway and London Underground station is Blackfriars, which is 550 yards (0.5 km) from the gallery.

History

Bankside Power Station 

Tate Modern is housed in the former Bankside Power Station, which was originally designed by Sir Giles Gilbert Scott, the architect of Battersea Power Station, and built in two stages between 1947 and 1963. It is directly across the river from St Paul's Cathedral. The power station closed in 1981.

The structure was roughly divided into three main areas each running east–west – the huge main Turbine Hall in the centre, with the boiler house to the north and the switch house to the south.

Initial redevelopment 
For many years after closure Bankside Power station was at risk of being demolished by developers. Many people campaigned for the building to be saved and put forward suggestions for possible new uses. An application to list the building was refused. In April 1994 the Tate Gallery announced that Bankside would be the home for the new Tate Modern. In July of the same year, an international competition was launched to select an architect for the new gallery. Jacques Herzog and Pierre de Meuron of Herzog & de Meuron were announced as the winning architects in January 1995. The £134 million conversion to the Tate Modern started in June 1995 and completed in January 2000.

The most obvious external change was the two-story glass extension on one half of the roof. Much of the original internal structure remained, including the cavernous main turbine hall, which retained the overhead travelling crane. An electrical substation, taking up the Switch House in the southern third of the building, remained on-site and owned by the French power company EDF Energy while Tate took over the northern Boiler House for Tate Modern's main exhibition spaces.

The history of the site as well as information about the conversion was the basis for a 2008 documentary Architects Herzog and de Meuron: Alchemy of Building & Tate Modern. This challenging conversion work was carried by Carillion.

Opening and initial reception 
Tate Modern was opened by the Queen on 11 May 2000.

Tate Modern received 5.25 million visitors in its first year. The previous year the three existing Tate galleries had received 2.5 million visitors combined.

Extension project 

Tate Modern had attracted more visitors than originally expected and plans to expand it had been in preparation since 2004. These plans focused on the south west of the building with the intention of providing 5,000 m2 of new display space, almost doubling the amount of display space.

The southern third of the building was retained by the French State owned power company EDF Energy as an electrical substation. In 2006, the company released the western half of this holding and plans were made to replace the structure with a tower extension to the museum, initially planned to be completed in 2015. The tower was to be built over the old oil storage tanks, which would be converted to a performance art space. Structural, geotechnical, civil, and façade engineering and environmental consultancy was undertaken by Ramboll between 2008 and 2016.

This project was initially costed at £215 million. Of the money raised, £50 million came from the UK government; £7 million from the London Development Agency; £6 million from philanthropist John Studzinski; and donations from, among others, the Sultanate of Oman and Elisabeth Murdoch.

In June 2013, international shipping and property magnate Eyal Ofer pledged £10m to the extension project, making it to 85% of the required funds. Eyal Ofer, chairman of London-based Zodiac Maritime Agencies, said the donation made through his family foundation would enable "an iconic institution to enhance the experience and accessibility of contemporary art". The Tate director, Nicholas Serota, praised the donation saying it would help to make Tate Modern a "truly twenty-first-century museum".

The Tanks 
The first phase of the expansion involved the conversion of three large, circular, underground oil tanks originally used by the power station into accessible display spaces and facilities areas. These opened on 18 July 2012 and closed on 28 October 2012 as work on the tower building continued directly above. They reopened following the completion of the Switch House extension in June 2016.

Two of the Tanks are used to show live performance art and installations while the third provides utility space. Tate describes them as "the world's first museum galleries permanently dedicated to live art".

The Switch House 

The original western half of the Switch House was demolished to make room for the tower and then rebuilt around it with large gallery spaces and access routes between the main building and the new tower on level 1 (ground level) and level 4. The new galleries on level 4 have natural top lighting. A bridge built across the turbine hall on level 4 provides an upper access route.

The new building opened to the public on 17 June 2016.

The design, again by Herzog & de Meuron, has been controversial. It was originally designed with a glass stepped pyramid, but this was amended to incorporate a sloping façade in brick latticework (to match the original power-station building) despite planning consent to the original design having been previously granted by the supervising authority.

The extension provides  of additional gross internal area for display and exhibition spaces, performance spaces, education facilities, offices, catering and retail facilities as well as a car parking and a new external public space.

In May 2017, the Switch House was formally renamed the Blavatnik Building, after Anglo-Ukrainian billionaire Sir Leonard Blavatnik, who contributed a "substantial" amount of the £260m cost of the extension. Sir Nicholas Serota commented, "Len Blavatnik's enthusiastic support ensured the successful realisation of the project and I am delighted that the new building now bears his name".

Galleries 
The collections in Tate Modern consist of works of international modern and contemporary art dating from 1900 until today.

Levels 2, 3 and 4 contain gallery space. Each of those floors is split into a large east and west wing with at least 11 rooms in each. Space between these wings is also used for smaller galleries on levels 2 and 4. The Boiler House shows art from 1900 to the present day.

The Switch House has eleven floors, numbered 0 to 10. Levels 0, 2, 3 and 4 contain gallery space. Level 0 consists of the Tanks, spaces converted from the power station's original fuel oil tanks, while all other levels are housed in the tower extension building constructed above them. The Switch House shows art from 1960 to the present day.

The Turbine Hall is a single large space running the whole length of the building between the Boiler House and the Switch House. At six storeys tall it represents the full height of the original power station building. It is cut by bridges between the Boiler House and the Switch House on levels 1 and 4 but the space is otherwise undivided. The western end consists of a gentle ramp down from the entrance and provides access to both sides on level 0. The eastern end provides a very large space that can be used to show exceptionally large artworks due its unusual height.

Exhibitions

Collection exhibitions 

The main collection displays consist of 8 areas with a named theme or subject. Within each area there are some rooms that change periodically showing different works in keeping with the overall theme or subject. The themes are changed less frequently. There is no admission charge for these areas.

As of June 2016 the themed areas were:
 Start Display: A three-room display of works by major artists to introduce the basic ideas of modern art.
 Artist and Society
 In The Studio
 Materials and Objects
 Media Networks
 Between Object and Architecture
 Performer and Participant
 Living Cities

There is also an area dedicated to displaying works from the Artist Rooms collection.

History of the collection exhibitions 

Since the Tate Modern first opened in 2000, the collections have not been displayed in chronological order but have been arranged thematically into broad groups. Prior to the opening of the Switch House there were four of these groupings at a time, each allocated a wing on levels 3 and 5 (now levels 2 and 4).

The initial hanging from 2000 to 2006:
 History/Memory/Society
 Nude/Action/Body
 Landscape/Matter/Environment
 Still Life/Object/Real Life

The first rehang at Tate Modern opened in May 2006. It eschewed the thematic groupings in favour of focusing on pivotal moments of twentieth-century art. It also introduced spaces for shorter exhibitions in between the wings. The layout was:
 Material Gestures
 Poetry and Dream
 Energy and Process
 States of Flux

In 2012, there was a partial third rehang. The arrangement was:
 Poetry and Dream
 Structure and Clarity
 Transformed Visions
 Energy and Process
 Setting the Scene – A smaller section, located between wings, covering installations with theatrical or fictional themes.

Temporary exhibitions

The Turbine Hall 

The Turbine hall, which once housed the electricity generators of the old power station, is five storeys tall with 3,400 square metres of floorspace. It is used to display large specially-commissioned works by contemporary artists, between October and March each year.

From 2000 until 2012, the series was named after its corporate sponsor, Unilever. In this time the company provided £4.4m sponsorship in total including a renewal deal of £2.2m for a period of five years agreed in 2008.
This series was planned to last the gallery's first five years, but the popularity of the series led to its extension until 2012.

The artists who have exhibited commissioned work in the Turbine Hall as part of the Unilever series are:

In 2013, Tate Modern signed a sponsorship deal worth around £5 million with Hyundai to cover a ten-year program of commissions, then considered the largest amount of money ever provided to an individual gallery or museum in the United Kingdom. The first commission for the Hyundai series is Mexican artist, Abraham Cruzvillegas.

The artists who have exhibited commissioned work in the Turbine Hall as part of the Hyundai series thus far are:

When there is no series running, the Turbine Hall is used for occasional events and exhibitions. In 2011 it was used to display Damien Hirst's For The Love of God. A sell-out show by Kraftwerk in February 2013 crashed the ticket hotline and website, causing a backlash from the band's fans. In 2018 the Turbine Hall was used for two performances of Messiaen's Et exspecto resurrectionem mortuorum and Stockhausen's Gruppen.

Major temporary exhibitions 
Two wings of the Boiler House are used to stage the major temporary exhibitions for which an entry fee is charged. These exhibitions normally run for three or four months. When they were located on a single floor, the two exhibition areas could be combined to host a single exhibition. This was done for the Gilbert and George retrospective due to the size and number of the works. 

A 2014 show of Henri Matisse provided Tate Modern with London's best-attended charging exhibition, and with a record 562,622 visitors overall, helped by a nearly five-month-long run. In 2018, Joan Jonas had a retrospective exhibition.

A Year in Art: Australia 1992, featuring contemporary Indigenous Australian art of 1992, which opened in June 2021, was extended until September 2022 owing to its popularity.

The Tanks 
The Tanks, located on level 0, are three large underground oil tanks, connecting spaces and side rooms originally used by the power station and refurbished for use by the gallery. One tank is used to display installation and video art specially commissioned for the space while smaller areas are used to show installation and video art from the collection. The Tanks have also been used as a venue for live music.

Project Space 
The Project Space (formerly known as the Level 2 Gallery) was a smaller gallery located on the north side of the Boiler House on level 1 which housed exhibitions of contemporary art in collaboration with other international art organisations. Its exhibitions typically ran for 2–3 months and then travelled to the collaborating institution for display there. The space was only accessible by leaving the building and re-entering using a dedicated entrance. It is no longer used as gallery space.

Other areas 
Works are also sometimes shown in the restaurants and members' rooms. Other locations that have been used in the past include the mezzanine on Level 1 and the north facing exterior of the Boiler House building.

Other facilities 
In addition to exhibition space there are a number of other facilities:
 A large performance space in one of the tanks on level 0 used to show a changing programme of performance works for which there is sometimes an entrance charge.
 The Starr Auditorium and a seminar room on level 1 which are used to show films and host events for which there is usually an entrance charge.
 The Clore Education Centre, Clore Information Room and McAulay Studios on level 0 which are facilities for use by visiting educational institutions.
 One large and several small shops selling books, prints and merchandise.
 A cafe, an espresso bar, a restaurant and bar and a members' room.
 Tate Modern community garden, co-managed with Bankside Open Spaces Trust

Access and environs 

The closest station is Blackfriars via its new south entrance. Other nearby stations include Southwark, as well as St Paul's and Mansion House north of the river which can be reached via the Millennium Bridge. The lampposts between Southwark tube station and Tate Modern are painted orange to show pedestrian visitors the route.

There is also a riverboat pier just outside the gallery called Bankside Pier, with connections to the Docklands and Greenwich via regular passenger boat services (commuter service) and the Tate to Tate service, which connects Tate Modern with Tate Britain.

To the west of Tate Modern is an area currently under redevelopment following the demolitions of Ludgate House, the former headquarters of Express Newspapers and Sampson House, a massive late Brutalist office building.

Transport connections 

 At the exit of Southwark tube station, orange lamposts direct visitors to Tate Modern.

Directors 
Frances Morris' appointment as director was announced in January 2016.
 Lars Nittve (1998–2001)
 Vicente Todolí (2003–2010)
 Chris Dercon (2010–2016)
 Frances Morris (2016–)

Protests 
Since 2010 there have been a series of protest art performances by the art collective Liberate Tate demanding the Tate to "disengage from BP as a sponsor, and stop allowing Tate to be used to deflect attention away from the devastating impacts that BP has around the world." BP is criticised for operations in relation with Petroleum exploration in the Arctic, the Deepwater Horizon oil spill, Oil sands and climate change. In June 2015 a group of artists occupied Tate Modern for 25 hours.

Selections from the permanent collection of paintings

See also 
 List of most visited museums in the United Kingdom
 List of most visited art museums
 List of museums in London

References

Further reading 

 

 Temporary Exhibitions at Tate Modern – 2008 to 2016, Dataset,

External links 

 
 'Tate Modern: a Year of Sweet Success' by Esther Leslie, in Radical Philosophy
 The buildings of Bankside Power Station(Tate Modern) and Battersea Power Station compared
 
 Extension project description

 Tate Modern
Energy infrastructure completed in 1947
Energy infrastructure completed in 1963
2000 in London
2000 establishments in England
Art museums established in 2000
Art museums and galleries in London
British art
Modern art museums in the United Kingdom
Contemporary art galleries in London
Museums sponsored by the Department for Digital, Culture, Media and Sport
Redevelopment projects in London
Museums in the London Borough of Southwark
Museums on the River Thames
Herzog & de Meuron buildings